Bardhyl Idrizi (born 25 December 1997), known mononymously as Bardhi, is a Macedonian-Albanian rapper. He attracted widespread attention in the Albanian-speaking Balkans upon the release of his breakthrough single, "Betohemi", which eventually peaked atop the Albanian chart.

Life and career

1997–present: Early life and career beginnings 

Bardhyl Idrizi was born on 25 December 1997 into an ethnic Albanian family in the city of Kumanovo, North Macedonia. Bardhi first gained national attention in the Albanian-speaking Balkans in October 2020, with the release of his acclaimed single, "Betohemi". It was an immediate commercial success, reaching number one in Albania for several consecutive weeks. Bardhi's chart success continued into November 2020 with his follow-up "Interes", which debuted at number one in the Albanian Top 100, upon its release. The rapper's debut studio album, Trëndafil, premiered on 9 November 2021. 14 singles were released from the record in the span of a year, seven of them to commercial success. "Do të doja" and "Diva" peaked at number six, respectively, while "Copë Copë", a collaboration with Kosovo-Albanian rapper Ledri Vula, reached the top five in Albania.

Discography

Albums

Studio albums 
 Trëndafil (2021)

Extended plays 
 21 (2019)

Singles

As lead artist

References 

1997 births
Living people
21st-century Albanian male singers
21st-century Albanian rappers
Albanian hip hop singers
Albanian musicians from North Macedonia
Albanian-language singers
Albanian songwriters
Albanian rappers
People from Kumanovo